Peter Stetina (born August 8, 1987) is an American off-road cyclist, who competes in gravel and endurance mountain bike racing as a privateer.

Career
Born in Boulder, Colorado, Stetina currently resides in California. Stetina's father Dale, and uncle Wayne are former road racing cyclists.

In April 2015, at the Tour of the Basque Country, Stetina suffered a broken knee cap and four broken ribs on the first stage. On the run-in to the finish, he slammed into a metal pole on the side of the road. His team blamed the organizers for poor rider safety measures.

Major results

2005
 1st  Road race, National Junior Road Championships
2008
 National Under-23 Road Championships
1st  Time trial
2nd Road race
 6th Time trial, UCI Under-23 Road World Championships
 6th Overall Flèche du Sud
 9th Liège–Bastogne–Liège U23
 10th Overall Tour de l'Avenir
 10th Redlands Bicycle Classic
2009
 1st  Time trial, National Under-23 Road Championships
 1st  Young rider classification Vuelta Mexico Telmex
 2nd Overall Tour of the Gila
 6th Overall Ronde de l'Isard
1st Stage 2
 7th Overall Tour de l'Avenir
 9th Liège–Bastogne–Liège U23
2010
 1st Mount Evans Hill Climb
 10th Trofeo Melinda
2012
 1st Stage 2 (TTT) Tour of Utah
 1st Stage 4 (TTT) Giro d'Italia
 9th Overall USA Pro Cycling Challenge
1st  Most Aggressive
2013
 3rd GP Miguel Induráin
 4th Overall Tour de Langkawi
2014
 6th Overall Tour of California
 8th Overall Tour de San Luis
2015
 5th La Drôme Classic
2017
 5th Overall Colorado Classic
 6th Overall Cascade Cycling Classic
1st Stage 3
 10th Milano–Torino
2018
 8th Overall Adriatica Ionica Race
 10th Overall Tour of Utah
2019
 1st Overall 2019 Belgian Waffle Ride California
 9th Overall Tour of Utah
 28th Overall 2019 Vuelta a España

Grand Tour general classification results timeline

References

External links

Cycling Base: Peter Stetina

1987 births
Living people
American male cyclists
Sportspeople from Boulder, Colorado
Cyclists from Colorado